Morton Lowry (born Edward Morton Lowater; 13 February 1914 – 26 November 1987) was a British actor. He is best known for his film roles as John Stapleton in The Hound of The Baskervilles (1939) and for his role as Mr. Jonas in How Green was My Valley (1941). He also appeared in other films including Pursuit to Algiers and The Picture of Dorian Gray (both 1945).

Personal life 
 
Morton was born in Lancashire, England as Edward Morton Lowater to Edward Morton Lowater, Sr., an engineer, and Bithiah 'Bertha' Holmes. The family later moved to the Russell Square area of London.

Morton was married at least three times. His first marriage was in 1934, when he was 20 years old, to Diana Whalley. This short-lived marriage ended in divorce in 1936. On 27 February 1938, Morton married socialite Virginia Barnato, granddaughter of diamond dealer Barney Barnato and daughter of racing car driver Woolf Barnato, on a San Francisco theatre stage after announcing their engagement on 15 February 1938. This relationship did not survive but one son was born. Morton went on to marry once more in 1957 and, though this union also ended in divorce, it produced one more child in 1958.

Morton Lowry moved back to the United States in the early 1960s to revive his film career. He died on 26 November 1987 at a San Francisco UCSF hospital from heart failure due to complications during surgery. His death was indigent and he was buried by the state at Pleasant Hill Cemetery in Sebastopol, California, on 14 January 1988.

Career
Morton started his stage career using the name Edward Lowater. He appeared in many stage revues, appearing in theatres such as the Alhambra Theatre, the London Astoria and the Garrick Theatre, where he is mostly credited as being part of the singing and dancing chorus line. He can be found credited in shows such as Over the Page in September 1933 and The Drunkard in November 1934.

His first known big break came in the role of Donnie in the film The Dawn Patrol acting under the name of Morton Lowry. This led to a respectable film career in which he completed over 25 films, including How Green Was My Valley, which received ten Academy Award nominations in the United States. He was one of the few actors to appear as different characters in the Basil Rathbone/Nigel Bruce Sherlock Holmes film series, as John Stapleton in The Hound of the Baskervilles (1939) and as the steward Sanford in Pursuit to Algiers (1945).

In 1947, Lowry's film career dwindled, with his last American film role being uncredited as a scared man in Calcutta. His last British film role was as Dinelli's driver in the 1960 film Too Hot to Handle.

Morton ventured into television work during the 1950s, most of which was in the United Kingdom. His work includes BBC Sunday Night Theatre in 1951, Theatre Royal (television film) in 1952 and Sword of Freedom in 1957. During 1959, he played various characters in the television series The Four Just Men. He also appeared as the Lieutenant in the 1959–60 television series The Adventures of Robin Hood in at least 12 episodes.

Filmography

References 

The Billy Rose Theatre Division
V&A Theatre & Performance Enquiry Service

External links 
 
 Oscar nominations for How Green Was My Valley

1914 births
1987 deaths
English male television actors
English male film actors
20th-century English male actors